Saint-Anselme Aerodrome  is located adjacent to Saint-Anselme, Quebec, Canada.

References

Registered aerodromes in Chaudière-Appalaches